Gazidari-ye Olya (also Romanized as Gazīdarī-ye ‘Olyā; also known as Gazīdarī-ye Bālā, Gazdari, Gazīdarī, and Qazī Darī) is a village in Arabkhaneh Rural District, Shusef District, Nehbandan County, South Khorasan Province, Iran. At the 2006 census, its population was 39, in 9 families.

References 

Populated places in Nehbandan County